Sosweawon or Sosaewon is a typical Korean garden of the middle Joseon Dynasty. It is located in the Nam-myeon, Damyang County of the South Jeolla Province, South Korea.

This garden harmonizes with nature in characteristic traditional Korean style. Clean waters in the valley flow below the wall and fall through the small cataract into the lake. This place can be said to be a cultivating house of  scholar spirit in that many Confucian scholars discussed academic subjects and wrote their works here.

History 
Soswaewon was originally constructed by Yang San-bo (양산보) from the end of 1520 through the middle of 1530. Yang gave up his government position after his teacher, Jo Gwang-jo (1482 - 1519) was exiled and then killed in the purge of 1519 called Gimyo sahwa (기묘사화). So Yang made this garden to seclude himself from social position. The part of the garden was burnt down during the Japanese invasions of Korea (1592–1598), but the buildings were reconstructed by his descendants, and the present Sosweawon was renovated by Yang Taek-ji, Yang san-bo's descendant in the fifth generation.
An 18th-century map of Sosweawon remains. It is carved on wood in the 31st year of King Yeongjo (1755), and shows the original design of the garden.

Structures 
Jewol Pavilion
Jewol Pavilion is a house for the host and means "bright moon after raining".

Gwangpung Pavilion
Gwangpung Pavilion is a house for guests and means "bright sun and fresh wind after raining".

Daebong Pavilion
Daebong Pavilion is located at high hill of Sosweawon. It means the luck of phoenix is regarded as the good news.

Gallery

See also
Hwanbyeokdang
Korean garden
Hanok
Seowon
Korean architecture

References 

 담양 소쇄원 남해 금산 명승지정, " Shegye daily news 2008.05.04

External links 

  Official site
  소쇄원 at Yesullo

Architecture in Korea
Damyang County
Scenic Sites of South Korea